Accelerade is a non-carbonated sports drink made by Pacific Health Laboratories. It is claimed to contain carbohydrates and proteins in a 4:1 ratio.

References

External links
 Official website

Non-alcoholic drinks
Sports drinks